The Vedda worm snake (Indotyphlops veddae), also known commonly as Veddha's blind snake, is a species of snake in the family Typhlopidae. The species is endemic to Sri Lanka.

Etymology
The specific name, veddae, is in honor of the Vedda people, aboriginal inhabitants of Sri Lanka.

Geographic range
The type locality of I. veddae is near Trincomalee, Sri Lanka.

Habitat
The preferred natural habitat of I. veddae is forest.

Description
I. veddae is uniformly lavender-gray, small, and very slender.

Reproduction
I. veddae is oviparous.

References

Further reading
Hedges SB, Marion AB, Lipp KM, Marin J, Vidal N (2014). "A taxonomic framework for typhlopid snakes from the Caribbean and other regions (Reptilia, Squamata)". Caribbean Herpetology 49: 1–61. (Indotyphlops veddae, new combination, p. 6).
Taylor EH (1947). "Comments on Ceylonese Snakes of the Genus Typhlops with Descriptions of New Species". University of Kansas Science Bulletin 31 (13): 283–298. (Typhlops veddae, new species, pp. 294–295, Figures 3A, 3B).

Indotyphlops
Reptiles described in 1947